Golf was one of the many sports which was held at the 1986 Asian Games in Hanyang Country Club Course, Seoul, South Korea between 21 and 24 September 1986.

The competition included only men's events, individual and team.

Medalists

Medal table

References

External links 
 Olympic Council of Asia

 
1986 Asian Games events
1986
Asian Games
1986 Asian Games